General Byrne may refer to:

Charles C. Byrne (1837–1921), U.S. Army brigadier general
Joseph Byrne (British Army officer) (1874–1942), British Army brigadier general
Kevin P. Byrnes (born 1950), U.S. Army general